Radoslav Kunzo (born 2 September 1974 in Levoča) is a Slovak football defender who plays for LP Domino.

References
 

1974 births
Living people
Slovak footballers
Expatriate footballers in Austria
FC VSS Košice players
FK Inter Bratislava players
People from Levoča
Sportspeople from the Prešov Region
Kapfenberger SV players
Slovak Super Liga players
ŠK Senec players
Association football defenders